Totah Vista is an unincorporated community and census-designated place (CDP) in San Juan County, New Mexico, United States. It was first listed as a CDP prior to the 2020 census.

The CDP is in the northern part of the county, on the north side of the San Juan River. It is bordered to the north by Farmington, the largest city in the county.

Demographics

Education 
Its school district is Farmington Municipal Schools.

References 

Census-designated places in San Juan County, New Mexico
Census-designated places in New Mexico